The 1923–24 season was Chelsea Football Club's fifteenth competitive season. The club finished 21st in the First Division and were relegated.

Table

References

External links
 1923–24 season at stamford-bridge.com

1923–24
English football clubs 1923–24 season